Women have been underrepresented in all three branches of Texas state government. Texas has had only two female governors over 175 years since statehood, and many prominent executive positions - such as Lieutenant Governor - have yet to be filled by women. While the percentage of women in the Texas Legislature has increased over the past few legislative sessions, as of December 2021, the percentage of female legislators in both the Texas House and the Texas Senate still fell far short of 50.3% - the percentage of women in the overall Texas population. The state's highest courts – the Supreme Court of Texas and the Texas Court of Criminal Appeals – have seen similarly low numbers of female justices throughout their history.

Executive Branch 

Women have been most present in the Texas executive branch as part of the State Board of Education. The first woman ever elected to statewide office in Texas was elected as Superintendent of Public Instruction (this position no longer exists; the duties of the former Superintendent of Public Instruction are now carried out by the appointed Commissioner of Education). At the urging of Texas suffragists, Annie Webb Blanton successfully ran for the position of Superintendent of Public Instruction in 1918. She won reelection in 1920 but did not seek a third term in 1922. After Blanton, several more women served as Superintendent of Public Instruction and on the State Board of Education once it was established in 1928. Currently, eight of the 15 members of the State Board of Education are women, including the board's secretary.

Outside of the State Board of Education, only nine women have been elected to executive office in Texas. Women have held the tile of Governor, State Treasurer or Comptroller of Public Accounts (the State Treasurer position was officially abolished in 1996, at which point the Comptroller of Public Accounts assumed many of the duties formerly held by the State Treasurer), Railroad Commissioner, and Agriculture Commissioner. Women have most commonly been elected to the positions of State Treasurer or Comptroller of Public Accounts, sometimes using these positions as springboards to other elected executive office. So far no women have acted as Lieutenant Governor, Land Commissioner, or Attorney General.

Texas has had only two female governors in its history. Miriam Ferguson (Democrat) became the state's first female governor in 1924. Her husband, James Ferguson (Democrat), had previously served as Texas governor but was unable to secure his place on the ballot in the 1924 election after being impeached in his last term. Instead, Miriam entered the race and ultimately won, carrying out her first term from 1925 to 1927. Scandals in her first administration caused Ferguson to lose her party's nomination in the 1926 election. Ferguson did not run in 1928. She did run in 1930 after the Supreme Court of Texas again denied her husband's petition to enter the race, but as in 1926, she failed to earn the Democratic Party nomination. In 1932, Ferguson ultimately won her bid for a second gubernatorial term and served this term from 1933 to 1935. In 1934, Ferguson temporarily retired from public office, only returning in 1940 for a final unsuccessful gubernatorial race. After Ferguson, Texas did not elect another female governor until Ann Richards (Democrat) over fifty years later in 1990. Richard first entered Texas local politics in 1976 as a Travis County Commissioner. She entered Texas state politics in 1982 when she won her first of two terms for Texas State Treasure. Richards served only one term as governor from 1991 to 1995, losing her 1994 reelection bid.

While there have not been any female governors of Texas since Ann Richards, the number of women elected in the executive branch has increased since her election. Prior to 1990, Texans elected only two women to executive office outside the State Board of Education. After 1990, Texans began regularly electing women to executive offices outside the State Board of Education, and a woman has consistently held at least one executive position since 1991. Currently, the only elected woman serving in a non-State Board of Education office in the Texas executive branch is Railroad Commissioner Christi Craddick.

Legislative Branch 
A total of 179 women have been elected to the Texas Legislature. One hundred sixty-one women have been elected to the Texas House of Representatives, and 23 women have been elected to the Texas Senate. The first woman elected to the Texas legislature was Edith Wilmans. Wilmans represented District 50 (Dallas County) in the Texas House for one term during the 38th Legislature in 1923. After Wilmans, the Texas House did not have another female representative until the 41st Legislature in 1929. The 41st Legislature marked the first time more than one woman served in the House. It was not until the 46th Legislature in 1939 that women were regularly elected to the Texas House each session. No woman was elected to the Texas Senate until the 40th Legislature in 1927 when Margie E. Neal was elected for her first of four terms. The Senate regularly had one female senator each session  from the 50th Legislature in 1947 to the 67th Legislature 1981. In the 68th Legislature of 1983, no women were elected to the Texas Senate. It was not until the 69th Legislature in 1985 that the Senate began regularly electing women each session, and it was not until the 70th Session in 1987 that more than one woman was first elected to the Texas Senate.

Two of the longest serving and highest ranking women in the Texas Legislative Branch are Judith Zaffirini (Democrat) and Senfronia Thompson (Democrat). Zaffirini is the longest-serving and highest-ranking ranking female and Hispanic senator. She has served 19 sessions in the Texas Senate, first winning election as the District 21 senator to the 1987 70th Legislature. She was the first Mexican American woman to be elected to the Senate and to serve as President Pro Tempore of the Senate, and she is currently the second highest-ranking senator overall. In the House of Representatives, Senfronia Thompson is the longest-serving woman and African American legislator in the history of the Texas Legislature. Thompson first won election to the 63rd Legislature in 1972 and has served a total of 25 terms in office. She currently represents northeast Houston in District 141 and is Dean of the House of Representatives.

Zaffrini in particular has gained recognition for being a particularly effective legislator during her long tenure. Zaffrini has cast more consecutive votes than any other state or national legislator in America. Zaffirini has a 100% perfect attendance record for Senate votes other than when she joined the Democratic Party's attempt to break Senate quorum in 2003 and refused to vote on a redistricting bill. In addition to casting the most votes of any Texas legislator, Zaffirini has also passed the most bills of any Texas legislator in state history. As of the end of the 87th Legislature in 2021, she has passed a total of 1,262 bills and 38 substantive resolutions. In the 85th Legislature, Zaffirini passed a personal record high 108 bills, despite serving in a Republican-majority chamber and needing signatures from a Republican governor. In the 87th Legislature, Zaffirini passed 106 bills, making her the legislator with the most bills passed for the fourth consecutive session. 

Despite the presence of notable women in office, according to the Center for American Women and Politics, Texas has consistently ranked in the bottom half of American states for its percentage of female state legislators. Between 1975 and 2021, Texas has had on average the 35th most female legislators of any state. Texas reached a high of 25th in the nation for percentage of female legislators in 2009 and 2010 - the only two years the state has been in the top half of states - and a low of 43rd in 1983 and 1984. Since women were first elected to the Texas Legislature in the 38th Session, women have comprised on average 8.5% of the Texas Legislature, with a low of 0.5% in 1923 and 1927 (excluding 1925 and 1937 when no women were elected to either chamber) and a high of 26.1% in 2021. Since the 38th Session, 8.7% of the House's 150 members have been female, while the Senate has averaged 7.5% female senators out of its 31 members. In any given session where at least one woman was elected, the House has had a maximum of 25.1% female members and a minimum of 0.6% female members, while the Senate has had a maximum of 32.3% female members and a minimum of 3.2% female members.

Judicial Branch 
Only fourteen women have been elected to Texas's highest state courts - the Supreme Court of Texas (highest court for civil matters) and the Texas Court of Criminal Appeals (highest court for criminal matters). Additional women have served on these courts via gubernatorial appointment but have not been elected by voters to serve on the courts. Some women have begun their career on the courts through a governor's appointment but have then won subsequent election campaigns to serve new terms.

A key milestone for women's representation on the Supreme Court of Texas was the Texas All-Women Supreme Court of 1925. The All-Women Supreme Court was a special session of the Supreme Court of Texas in which Texas Governor Pat Morris Neff appointed three female justices to serve on the court to preside over a case in which all the court's male justices possessed a conflict of interest. The case involved a politically influential fraternal association known as the Woodmen of the World. At the time of the case, almost all Texas elected officials and lawyers were a part of the association. Realizing any male he could appoint would also likely have ties to the organization, Governor Neff resolved to appointment an all-female court. Neff appointed Hortense Sparks Ward to serve as the special court's Special Chief Justice. Ward had been the first woman to pass the Texas state bar exam, as well as the first Texas woman admitted to practice before the United States Supreme Court. Neff appointed Hattie Leah Henenberg and Ruth Virginia Brazzil to fill the remaining two spots. The All-Women Supreme Court met from January to May 1925 and was the first all-female court in the United States.

Despite the success of the All-Women Supreme Court, it would be another almost 60 years before women served on the Supreme Court of Texas again. In 1982, Ruby Kless Sondock became the first woman appointed as a regular justice on the Supreme Court of Texas. Governor William P. Clements appointed Sondock to serve out the remainder of the term of another justice who died in office. Once this initial term ended, Sondock did not seek election to the court. It would be another ten years before Texans would elect the first of six women to the Supreme Court of Texas. In 1992, Rose Spector became the first woman elected to the Supreme Court of Texas after previously serving as an elected county court judge and one of the first females elected to countywide office in Bexar County. Spector served only one term on the Supreme Court of Texas, while subsequent women have served up to two terms on the court. Currently, two elected women are serving on the Supreme Court of Texas, comprising a minority of the court's nine-justice membership. No women has ever been elected Chief Justice of the Supreme Court of Texas. 

The Texas Court of Criminal Appeals has had higher levels of women's representation both historically and currently than the Supreme Court of Texas. Eight women have been elected to the Texas Court of Criminal Appeals. Four women currently serve on the court, comprising almost half of the court's nine-judge membership. The current presiding judge of the Texas Court of Criminal Appeals - Sharon Keller - is a woman. Keller is the first and only woman to serve as head of either of the state's highest courts. Keller was also the first woman to be elected to the Texas Court of Criminal Appeals after winning her first of four terms in 2000.

References 

Wikipedia Student Program
Women in Texas politics